Srikrishna Mohan and Ramkumar Mohan are Carnatic classical musicians. The title Trichur Brothers was conferred by HH Jayendra Saraswathi  Maha Swamigal of Kanchi Mutt.

Their father is veteran Mridangam Vidwan Shri Trichur R Mohan. Their music journey started quite early, under the able guidance of their father. Their style of music is very much appreciated.

Biography 
The Trichur Brothers were initially trained by Madurai Shrimati Balamani Eswar and Shri Thamarakkadu Govindan Namboothiri. They received advanced training, with emphasis on Manodharma singing, from Late Professor Neyyattinkara Mohanachandran. They were fortunate to be under the guidance of Padma Bhushan, Shri PS Narayana Swami for more than a decade, after they moved to Chennai. The brothers are currently learning from Shri Reju Narayanan.

Their style of raga exploration, which involves the exchange of melodic phrases between them, has been lauded for its uniqueness. While adhering to the traditions and essence of Carnatic music, they have also forayed into world music in their collaborations through their fusion band, Anubhoothi, and performed jugalbandis with renowned Hindustani classical musicians.

The brothers are qualified Chartered Accountants and completed their schooling from Hari Sri Vidya Nidhi School, Thrissur.

Albums 
 Musically Yours
 Panchalinga Kshetra Kritis
 Rama Bhakthi Samrajyam
 Musically Yours 2
 Live Concerts Compilation

Productions 
 Shiva Thandav
 Namami Gange
 Vandhe Bharathambe
 Hanuman Chalisa
 Ganesha Pancharathna Stotra
One with the Tanpura

References 

Indian musical groups
Hari Sri Vidya Nidhi School alumni
Indian musical duos